Veeri is a village in India currently under the jurisdiction of the tehsil Bijbehara and the district Anantnag in southern Kashmir.

Geography

Veeri is at a distance of 2 Kms from river Jhelum and 7 Kms to the north of Anantnag city . Bijbehara hometown is 5 Kms to the south, Srinagar capital city is 56 Kms from Iqbal market Veeri.

Demographics
At the 2011 census, the total population of Veeri was 2164, of whom 1065 were males and 1099 females.

References

Villages in Anantnag district